Luksika "Luk" Kumkhum (born 21 July 1993) is a Thai tennis player. She turned professional in 2011, and reached her career-high singles ranking of world No. 66 on 19 November 2018. On 16 July 2018, she peaked at No. 86 of the WTA doubles rankings.

Career
In 2010, Kumkhum had won one ITF Circuit event in singles but three events in doubles. The following year, she won five singles ITF events, all $10ks, and two in doubles. In 2012, she won two singles and two doubles events on the ITF Circuit.

2013
In 2013, she cracked the top 200 and started to play on the WTA Tour as well as the ITF Circuit. Kumkhum qualified for the Australian Open where she defeated Sofia Arvidsson in the first round, she was then beaten by Jamie Hampton. She played the Malaysian Open where she qualified for the tournament and reached the quarterfinals defeating Olivia Rogowska and Eleni Daniilidou en route before falling to Ayumi Morita in the quarterfinals, she also reached the semifinals of the tournament where she partnered with Erika Sema, falling to Janette Husárová and Zhang Shuai in the semifinals. In April 2013, she won the 25k event in Phuket, defeating Lisa Whybourn in the finals. 

She played the Roland Garros qualifying event where she defeated Zarina Diyas before falling to Sandra Záhlavová in the second qualifying round. She then suffered first-round losses at Nottingham, Birmingham and Wimbledon. Kumkhum's next event was the 100k event, President's Cup in Astana, where she defeated Eugeniya Pashkova, Noppawan Lertcheewakarn in the second round, and Ekaterina Bychkova in the quarterfinals before she lost to Nadiya Kichenok in the semifinals. In the doubles event, she and Tamarine Tanasugarn reached the final before falling to first seeds Nina Bratchikova and Valeria Solovyeva.

2014
At the Australian Open, Kumkhum, ranked No. 87 in the world, caused a major upset when she defeated former Wimbledon champion Petra Kvitová in the first round, in three sets. This was the first time ever that Kumkhum had ever faced a top-ten opponent in her career. She then suffered first-round loss at the Pattaya Open from Julia Görges, in straight sets.

2017: First WTA doubles final
She reached the final at the 2017 Korea Open with partner compatriot Peangtarn Plipuech.

2018: Australian Open third round, Two Challenger singles titles
Having qualified for the Australian Open, Kumkhum has progressed to the third round of a Grand Slam tournament for the first time. In the second round, she defeated former top-ten player Belinda Bencic, 6–1, 6–3.

2023: WTA semifinal in doubles 
In 2023 she reached the semifinals at the home tournament in Hua Hin, Thailand as a wildcard with partner compatriot Peangtarn Plipuech after the withdrawal of Anna Kalinskaya and Linda Fruhvirtova.

Grand Slam singles performance timeline

WTA career finals

Doubles: 1 (runner-up)

WTA Challenger finals

Singles: 2 (2 titles)

ITF Circuit finals

Singles: 28 (18 titles, 10 runner–ups)

Doubles: 24 (15 titles, 9 runner–ups)

Top 10 wins

References

External links
 
 
 

1993 births
Living people
LGBT tennis players
Luksika Kumkhum
Lesbian sportswomen
Luksika Kumkhum
Tennis players at the 2010 Summer Youth Olympics
Tennis players at the 2014 Asian Games
Asian Games medalists in tennis
Luksika Kumkhum
Luksika Kumkhum
Luksika Kumkhum
Medalists at the 2014 Asian Games
Universiade medalists in tennis
Luksika Kumkhum
Luksika Kumkhum
Southeast Asian Games medalists in tennis
Tennis players at the 2018 Asian Games
Medalists at the 2018 Asian Games
Competitors at the 2015 Southeast Asian Games
Universiade silver medalists for Thailand
Competitors at the 2017 Southeast Asian Games
Competitors at the 2019 Southeast Asian Games
Luksika Kumkhum
Medalists at the 2015 Summer Universiade
Luksika Kumkhum
Competitors at the 2021 Southeast Asian Games